Vladimir Viktorovich Suchilin (22 January 1950 – 2 November 2014) was a Soviet football player from Kolchugino.

Honours
 Soviet Top League winner: 1976 (autumn).

International career
Suchilin played his only game for USSR on 28 November 1976 in a friendly against Argentina.

External links
  Profile

1950 births
2014 deaths
Russian footballers
Soviet footballers
Soviet Union international footballers
Soviet Top League players
FC Torpedo Moscow players
FC Lokomotiv Nizhny Novgorod players
Association football midfielders
FC Spartak Kostroma players
FC Torpedo Vladimir players